Rufus W. Holsinger (1866–1930) was an American photographer based in Charlottesville, Virginia, United States.  His 9000 remaining black-and-white photographic plates and 500 celluloid negatives are maintained in the Albert and Shirley Small Special Collections Library  at the University of Virginia.

Birth 
Holsinger was born in 1866 in Bedford County, Pennsylvania, to parents Thomas and Elizabeth Holsinger.

Career 
In the late 1880s, Holsinger settled in Charlottesville and opened the Holsinger University Studio on West Main Street. He was active in local politics and served as treasurer of the Photographers Association of America.

References

Further reading 
 Heblich and Walters, Holsinger's Charlottesville, 1890–1925. Selected Photographs From The Collection of Rufus W. Holsinger (Batt Bates & Co., 1976)
 Brennan, Charlottesville (Arcadia Publishing, 2011)

External links 
 
 Library of Congress digital images
 Photographs of Rufus W. Holsinger
 Holsinger at 100:Henry Martin

American photographers
1866 births
1930 deaths
People from Bedford, Pennsylvania
People from Charlottesville, Virginia